"" is the national anthem of Ivory Coast. Adopted under law n°60–207 on 27 July 1960, its status as national anthem is enshrined in the constitution's 29th article. It takes the form of a lyric and very patriotic poem, invoking inspiring imagery expressing the greatness of the Ivorian soil and values such as hope, peace, dignity, and the "true brotherhood".

History 

Adopted in 1960 at the country's independence, ""  remains the national anthem of Côte d'Ivoire, as the capital cities is now Yamoussoukro (de jure) and Abidjan (de facto). This hymn is strongly tinged with patriotism and influenced by religion. The lyrics are from ministers Mathieu Vangah Ekra and Joachim Bony. The music has been composed by abbots Pierre-Marie Coty alongside Pierre-Michel Pango, taking   "La Marseillaise" as a model.

Between 2007 and 2009, and under the leadership of Laurent Gbagbo, there was a proposal to replace "" with a different song, "" as the national anthem. This Ode was composed in 2002 after the start of the Ivorian civil war, and was selected by contest in 2003. "" was sung by supporters of the now former head of state and broadcast on the RTI's television network instead of "" until 2007, even though the latter remained, according to the constitution, the country's national anthem. However, the proposal was eventually dropped.

Lyrics

Notes

References

Further reading
  , Lumière sur l'Abidjanaise : l'hymne national, CEDA, 2000,

External links 
  The Republic's symbols on the Ivorian presidency's website
 Video of the Song of Abidjan, sung in its entirety

African anthems
Ivorian music
National symbols of Ivory Coast
Ivorian songs
Articles containing video clips
1960 establishments in Ivory Coast
National anthem compositions in A-flat major
National anthem compositions in F-sharp major